In mathematics, the butterfly lemma or Zassenhaus lemma, named after Hans Zassenhaus, is a technical result on the lattice of subgroups of a group or the lattice of submodules of a module, or more generally for any modular lattice.

Lemma. Then there is an isomorphism of quotient groups:

Zassenhaus proved this lemma specifically to give the most direct proof of the Schreier refinement theorem. The 'butterfly' becomes apparent when trying to draw the Hasse diagram of the various groups involved.

Zassenhaus' lemma for groups can be derived from a more general result known as Goursat's theorem stated in a Goursat variety (of which groups are an instance); however the group-specific modular law also needs to be used in the derivation.

References

Resources
.
.
 Carl Clifton Faith, Nguyen Viet Dung, Barbara Osofsky (2009) Rings, Modules and Representations. p. 6. AMS Bookstore, 
 Hans Zassenhaus (1934) "Zum Satz von Jordan-Hölder-Schreier", Abhandlungen aus dem Mathematischen Seminar der Universität Hamburg 10:106–8.
 Hans Zassenhaus (1958) Theory of Groups, second English edition, Lemma on Four Elements, p 74, Chelsea Publishing.

External links
 Zassenhaus Lemma and proof at https://web.archive.org/web/20080604141650/http://www.artofproblemsolving.com:80/Wiki/index.php/Zassenhaus%27s_Lemma

Lemmas in group theory
Isomorphism theorems